James A. Blumenstock (April 28, 1918 – July 31, 1963) was an American football fullback. He played for the New York Giants in 1947.

A resident of Lyndhurst, New Jersey, Blumenstock died at Passaic General Hospital in Passaic, New Jersey.

References

1918 births
1963 deaths
American football fullbacks
Fordham Rams football players
New York Giants players
People from Lyndhurst, New Jersey
People from Rutherford, New Jersey
Players of American football from New Jersey
Rutherford High School (New Jersey) alumni

Sportspeople from Bergen County, New Jersey

Links
www.findagrave.com/memorial/163889648/james-a-blumenstock